Duke's Aldridge Academy (formerly Northumberland Park Community School) is a co-educational secondary school located in the Northumberland Park ward of Tottenham in the London Borough of Haringey, United Kingdom.

The school offers GCSEs and BTECs as programmes of study for pupils.

The school site is located immediately next to Tottenham Hotspur F.C.'s newly built Tottenham Hotspur Stadium, which can be seen from the playground.

History
Northumberland Park Community School was founded in 1972. There were delays in the construction of the school building in Trulock Road, so pupils were temporarily taught in former Tottenham County School buildings in Tottenham Green. The school eventually occupied its purpose-built site in 1977.

The inaugural Headmaster was Mr David Pert. Mr John Coughlan became Headmaster in 1997-2004, followed by Mr Andy Kilpatrick in 2005 (as Headteacher), and last Miss Monica Duncan in 2009 (who changed her title from Headteacher to Executive Principal in 2019). Kilpatrick received an OBE from HM The Queen for services to education after an incident in which he was attacked at knifepoint by a Year 10 pupil in 2008.

Northumberland Park underwent a number of building extensions over the years, including a renovation and redecoration programme of works as part of the Building Schools for the Future scheme.

The school had an attached provision for students in Years 12 and 13, Northumberland Park Community School Sixth Form, but this was closed in the early 2000s after being put into special measures by Ofsted. Following the opening of Haringey Sixth Form Centre in nearby White Hart Lane, Haringey Council closed all school sixth forms in the poor east of the borough (retaining those in the wealthy west of the borough) and declared all schools in the Tottenham and Wood Green to be designated feeder schools for the new sixth form centre.

Previously a community school administered by Haringey London Borough Council, in September 2017 Northumberland Park Community School converted to academy status and is now sponsored by the Aldridge Education Trust. The conversion to academy status was a source of controversy, with former members of Northumberland Park's senior leadership team claiming that the school had converted to academy status in the way set out by the Department for Education, and others disputing this claim.

Admissions
The school follows Haringey Council's admissions procedure.

In the event of oversubscription, priority is allocated first to students with Education, Health and Care Plans, then to children in care/Looked After Children, then to those with an exceptional social or medical need.

As the feeder school for new-arrivals in the United Kingdom for Haringey Council, pupils with refugee or asylum seeker status, or who do not speak English as a first language and are recently settled in the UK, are automatically admitted to the school.

Performance and data

Exam results and school performance

The school suffered many years of poor examination results and was frequently in Ofsted special measures.  However, in 2013 the school achieved its highest GCSE pass rate, with 41% of pupils achieving the required 5 GCSE or BTEC qualifications at grades A*-D. This means that 59% of pupils still do not achieve the minimum requirement as laid out by the Department for Education. However, the improved rate was celebrated at the time.

Demographics
Most pupils live near the school in areas of pronounced social disadvantage. Overall attainment on entry in Year 7 is very low in most years; the proportion of students on the school's Special Educational Needs register is well above average at 33%. The proportion eligible for free school meals is 81%, which is well above the national average and the highest in the London Borough of Haringey. As of the 2018/19 academic year, the parents of 48% of pupils had registered for additional school funding to tackle disadvantage through the Pupil Premium.

Boys outnumber girls at the school by about 10%. Pupils are drawn from a range of ethnic minority backgrounds and 53 languages are spoken. The largest groups are Turkish and Kurdish (at 21%), Somali (at 24%), Black Caribbean (at 31%), and Black African (at 15%). Numbers of Eastern European pupils are increasing, particularly those of Romanian, Bulgarian and Polish ethnicity, reflecting population change in the local area. Among the smallest ethnic groups are those from the Indian subcontinent (at 3.8%), Chinese (at 1.4%), and White British (at 0.6%). In the homes of a very high proportion of pupils, at 72%, English is an additional language, with about 36% of pupils at very early stages of learning English. Student mobility is a feature of the school; 28% are refugees, mainly of Turkish or Kurdish background. A number of pupils, particularly those of Kurdish background, are suspected to be of adult age. However, difficulties with verifying the age of refugees has meant that those misleading authorities about their age are admitted to the school. This has led to safeguarding concerns. The school is the designated feeder school for Haringey Council for new-arrivals in the United Kingdom, including refugees and asylum seekers, and migrants from within the European Union and elsewhere.

Staff turnover is high, but the school has made efforts to improve retention of staff, including health and wellbeing programmes, free on-site secure parking, and provision of discrete stab vests which can be worn under clothes to protect from pupil or intruder knife attacks. The school previously participated in several initiatives under the Labour government of the early 2000s, including Excellence in Cities, a small Education Action Zone initiative, and Urban Regeneration.

Reputation and improvement efforts

Exam results and Ofsted inspection reports
The school suffered many years of poor examination results and was frequently in Ofsted special measures. However, by the mid-2000s the school had been rated as 'satisfactory' with several 'good' features.

Crime and safety concerns
The school has suffered from crime and anti-social behaviour on and around its premises since its foundation, but particularly from the late 1990s onwards. By the mid-2000s, knife-related incidents had become commonplace, including an incident which led to the departure of Andy Kilpatrick as Headteacher in which a knife was held to his throat by a Year 10 pupil. Kilpatrick later received an OBE for his work at Northumberland Park. According to a local authority report, several leading criminal figures were "cultivated" in the school, including Khalid Mohamed Omar Ali, the Whitehall terror suspect, and Reece Dempster, the murderer and rapist who received a life sentence, a rarity in the UK. The high prevalence of gang membership among the pupil body and within the wider local area of Tottenham also presents challenges for the school, with safeguarding concerns around how gangs operate within the school, exploiting younger pupils who join their ranks.

To quell concerns of violence, the school initiated several intervention programmes in the late 2000s focused on its Black Caribbean, Black African, Somali, Turkish/Kurdish, and Eastern European (specifically Romanian and Bulgarian) ethnic groups. The school also established new academic attainment programmes for these pupils to provide additional support with their learning, as well as a stream for minority ethnic groups in the school (namely those of Indian subcontinent origin and Chinese pupils). This led to concerns around a lack of support for White British pupils, who were the school's smallest ethnic group at 0.6% and were the only group not to receive this additional support.

To further help combat the prevalence of violence on school premises, knife arch metal detectors were installed at all pupil entrances, and the Metropolitan Police began to maintain a permanent presence on site. The school had previously received visits from a dedicated schools police officer as part of the Safer Schools Partnership, which sees officers attached to local secondary schools, but this was short lived due to safety concerns. A knife drop bin was installed in the boys toilets out of the view of CCTV in 2017, to allow pupils to safely dispose of knives without fear of punishment.

Building redevelopment
The school was partially redeveloped as part of the Building Schools for the Future programme, which included the construction of a new Internal Exclusion Unit and Art Block, the installation of new library and computing facilities, and a redecoration of parts of the school which were not redeveloped. Improvements were made to the playground surface, with new Astroturf laid on the football pitch, and a repainting of the school's locally-infamous 16 ft wall from purple to dark blue. New CCTV, security and fire alarms, and entry systems were also installed.

School identity

Uniform and school colours
The school's colours were previously purple and yellow, however a decision was taken to change this owing to association with the local NPK (Northumberland Park Kings) gang, who themselves had based their colours on the school's uniform. The school colours are now turquoise and white, in line with Aldridge Education branding.

The school uniform includes a purple sweatshirt and white or lilac polo shirt. Pupils wear grey or black trousers or jogging bottoms, or a grey or black skirt. Pupils do not have to wear uniform with the school logo on to reduce costs. Shoes or trainers must be black. The school is due to change its uniform as part of the academy transition process. The school subsidises some of the cost of pupils' uniform by giving cash grants to families. Non-compliance with the uniform policy is widespread.

The school's motto was previously 'Motivate. Aspire. Transform.', however, this has since been changed to 'Inspire to Excel' as part of the transition to academy status and to bring the school further in line with Aldridge branding. Historically, the school's motto since its founding in 1977 was the Latin phrase 'Curamus'.

School newspaper
Historically, there was a monthly school newspaper under the name 'Curamus', the Latin phrase which was the school's motto, written and edited by pupils. Curamus ceased to be printed some time in the late 1990s. The tradition of a school newspaper was revived in 2013 with the NPCS News, which is a termly magazine. However, NPCS News did not have pupil involvement as before, and was instead produced by the school's Marketing Officer and administrative staff. The magazine was renamed 'Duke's News' in 2018 to reflect the school's transition to academy status and membership of the Aldridge Education academy chain.

Extra-curricular activities

Duke of Edinburgh's Award
Pupils can participate in The Duke of Edinburgh's Award, which is a voluntary programme of activities that can be undertaken by anyone aged from 14 to 25, founded by HRH The Duke of Edinburgh. The school allows pupils in Year 9 to work towards achieving the Bronze Award, followed by an opportunity to complete the Silver Award during Year 10.

Performing arts (school specialism)
The school was a designated ‘specialist arts college’ under the UK specialist schools programme. In line with this subject specialism, pupils take part in a range of activities organised by the Music and Drama departments. Highlights include the annual Jamaican Independence Day assembly which features singing and steel pans.

Pupils also have the opportunity to design their own performances, such as the 2017 pupil-led play ‘Dutty Babylon’ which focused on the life of musician Smiley Culture and culminated with a rendition of his infamous song, ‘Police Officer’, and a 2018 video on police stop and search, which saw pupils criticising the Metropolitan Police Service which they considered to be "institutionally racist".

The school's performing arts provision has been praised for giving pupils a voice to express themselves.

Clubs
The school has a number of lunchtime and after school clubs, including film club and chess club. It also has a thriving self-defence club which aims to instruct pupils on how to tackle an attacker with a knife if they are unable to run away given the high prevalence of knife crime in the local community, including incidents on school grounds.

Peripatetic lessons
Pupils at the school are able to learn to play instruments, including the Turkish Bağlama, Trinidadian and Tobagonian steel pans, and the recorder. The school subsidises some of the cost for pupils to learn to play these instruments as a result of its expressive arts subject specialism.

Inclusion
At the school, the proportion of students on the school's Special Educational Needs (SEN) register is well above both the national and borough average at 33%. Pupils with disabilities and additional needs are supported in mainstream classrooms and follow the school's curriculum. Many of these students have English as an additional language, further complicating their learning difficulties. The school has been accused of off-rolling and permanently excluding pupils with SEN several times, most recently in the 2017/18 academic year. Under the leadership of a new Headteacher in 2009, the SEN Department was disbanded and replaced with a new 'Differentiation Department', much to the derision of staff, parents and pupils who felt that this would single out students with SEN as 'different'.

Prior to 2009, Northumberland Park had been a beacon school for its outstanding SEN provision, including work to integrate pupils with additional needs into the mainstream school community.

Notable former pupils
 Gak Jonze, rapper
 Viddal Riley, boxer
 Wretch 32, rapper
 Letitia Wright, actress

Notable former staff
 Jane Clarke, scientist
 Raman Patrick Sisupalan, footballer
 Alison Drake (Jankowska), diver

The Vale School
The school shares part of its main building with The Vale School, a special school for pupils with complex medical needs. The Vale remains separate to Northumberland Park, sharing only its premises. Pupils from The Vale arrive and leave school at different times to Northumberland Park pupils, to avoid the crowds.

In 2013, The Vale School received a royal visit from HRH The Countess of Wessex to open a new outdoor garden designed to support pupils' physical development. The royal visit was attended by staff and pupils from the school, and the ceremonial Mayor of the London Borough of Haringey. In 2014, part of the garden was destroyed by pupils from Northumberland Park, but was rebuilt the following year by volunteers from several local charities as part of a 'community action day'.

References

External links
  Duke's Aldridge Academy official website

Secondary schools in the London Borough of Haringey
Academies in the London Borough of Haringey
Educational institutions established in 1972
1972 establishments in England